Pasquale de' Rossi (* 1641 in Vicenza; † 28 June 1722 in Rome), also known as Pasqualino de' Rossi, was an Italian painter of the Baroque period.

Born in Vicenza, he was mostly self-trained in design. He painted a Baptism of Christ for the Montemirabile Chapel in the Basilica of Santa Maria del Popolo in Rome and also painted much for the Royal Palace of Turin.

References

 

1641 births
People from Vicenza
17th-century Italian painters
Italian male painters
Painters from Vicenza
Italian Baroque painters
Year of death unknown